"Women Lie, Men Lie" is a single by American rapper Yo Gotti. It features rapper Lil Wayne. It was released on iTunes on December 11, 2009, for digital download. This song samples the Jay-Z song "Reminder" released earlier that year.

Background
Following his signing to J Records in 2009, Yo Gotti began to record material for his debut studio album, titled Live from the Kitchen. "5 Star", the first single released from the album, became Gotti's first song to appear on the US Billboard Hot 100, peaking at number 79. In an interview with HipHopDX, Gotti revealed that he had recorded a song with Lil Wayne for the album, although the title was not announced at the time. Following its leak online, "Women Lie, Men Lie" was released for digital download on December 14, 2009, originally as the second single from Live from the Kitchen. However, Live from the Kitchen experienced several delays to its release date which meant it was not released until January 10, 2012, and "5 Star" (although it is present in a remixed form featuring fellow rappers Gucci Mane, Trina and Nicki Minaj) and "Women Lie, Men Lie" were removed from the album's track listing. "We Can Get It On", a collaboration with singer Ciara, was later released as the new first single from the album on May 19, 2011.

Composition
"Women Lie, Men Lie" is backed by a propulsive, "swaggering" electronica-based production. It is of three minutes and 36 seconds in length, and the song's concept and title were inspired by lyrics from fellow rapper Jay-Z's song "Reminder", from his album The Blueprint 3 (2009).

Music video
The music video debuted on BET. It features a story about a girl. Lil Wayne filmed this video before his jail sentence.

Charts

Weekly charts

Year-end charts

Certifications

References

External links

2009 singles
2009 songs
Yo Gotti songs
J Records singles
Songs written by Lil Wayne
Songs written by Yo Gotti